ARTC may refer to:

 Army Recruit Training Centre, in Australia
 ArthroCare (NASDAQ: ARTC) is an American manufacturer of medical devices
 Atlanta Radio Theatre Company, an American theatre troupe
 Australian Rail Track Corporation, a government-owned corporation
 Automotive Research & Testing Center, a Taiwanese non-profit research lab
 ARTC HD63484, a graphics processor released by Hitachi; see